Minnesota State Highway 95 (MN 95) is a  highway in east-central Minnesota, which runs from its intersection with State Highway 23 near St. Cloud and continues east and south to its southern terminus at its intersection with U.S. Highways 61 / 10 (co-signed) at Cottage Grove.

This highway has two distinct segments (East/West section and a North/South section) that meet at Taylors Falls.

MN 95 passes through the cities of Princeton, Cambridge, North Branch, Taylors Falls, Stillwater, and Lakeland.

Route description

State Highway 95 has a somewhat unusual routing, starting with a west-to-east section between St. Cloud and Taylors Falls, then finishing with a north–south section between Taylors Falls and Cottage Grove.  In fact, the Minnesota Legislature originally authorized the east–west and the north–south routes as two separate highways.  The Minnesota Highway Department decided to give them both the same route number.

This highway runs through mostly rural areas immediately north and east of the Twin Cities, although increasing development in the eastern suburbs of Saint Paul may bring increased traffic to the highway.  Primarily a two-lane highway, Highway 95 has a short concurrency with Interstate 94/US Highway 12 between Woodbury and Lakeland, that makes up the only divided highway sections of Highway 95.

The  section of Highway 95 from Cambridge to North Branch is officially designated the State Trooper Timothy J. Bowe Memorial Highway.

State Parks

Highway 95, on its north–south section, parallels the St. Croix River and is adjacent to, or close to, several state parks:
 Wild River State Park
 Interstate Park
 William O'Brien State Park
 Afton State Park

History
Both sections of State Highway 95 were authorized in 1933.

By 1940, Highway 95 was paved between Princeton and North Branch; and between Scandia and Afton.

The route was completely paved by 1953. 

In 1998, a change was made in the alignment on the south end of Highway 95, between Washington County Road 18 and I-94.  Previously, Highway 95 turned east on 40th Street South in Afton and then turned north on the St. Croix Trail; present day Highway 95 now continues north along Manning Avenue (the Afton / Woodbury border) and then runs together with I-94 briefly east to Lakeland. The old route of Highway 95 for this section is now signed as County Road 18.

In an effort to maximize driver safety, a roundabout was constructed at the intersection of Highway 95 and County Road 29 in Princeton.  The project was completed in November 2010 at a cost of $6.7 million.

A five-mile section of Highway 95 near Bayport in Washington County was honored with a 2013 Perpetual Pavement Award in recognition of its long life without any structural failure and only periodic resurfacing.

Prior to August 2, 2017, MN 95 ran concurrent with MN 36 from Oak Park Heights to Chestnut Street in downtown Stillwater, where MN 36 then turned east to cross the Stillwater Lift Bridge. Upon the opening of the St. Croix Crossing bridge, this concurrency was eliminated and Highways 95 and 36 now have a full interchange with each other.

Major intersections

References

095
Transportation in Benton County, Minnesota
Transportation in Mille Lacs County, Minnesota
Transportation in Isanti County, Minnesota
Transportation in Chisago County, Minnesota
Transportation in Washington County, Minnesota